St. François Xavier Stadium is a multi-use stadium in Port Louis, Port Louis District, Mauritius.  It is currently used mostly for football matches and is the home stadium of AS Port-Louis 2000.  The stadium holds 2,500 people.

References

External links
Stadiums in Mauritius

Football venues in Mauritius